Edward Kelley is the name of:
 Edward Kelley, occultist
 Edward J. Kelley (1883–1960), mayor of Norwalk, Connecticut (1945–1947) 
 Edward Kelley (American football), American football player
 Eddie Kelley, American soldier of World War II

See also
Edward Kelly (disambiguation)
Ned Kelly